Kuyuköy can refer to:

 Kuyuköy, Çermik
 Kuyuköy, Merzifon